Stuart Pearson (born 1949) is an English footballer.

Stuart Pearson may also refer to:

 Stuart Pearson (Ireland) (born c. 1984), Irish person
 Stuart Pearson, CEO of Langbar International
 Stuart Pearson, character in Aliens in the Attic
 Stuart Pearson (boxer) (1934–2015), English boxer
 Stuart Pearson Wright (born 1975), English artist